Cissy Davies (1 December 1932 – 4 October 2005) was a British gymnast. She competed at the 1948 Summer Olympics and the 1952 Summer Olympics.

References

1932 births
2005 deaths
British female artistic gymnasts
Olympic gymnasts of Great Britain
Gymnasts at the 1948 Summer Olympics
Gymnasts at the 1952 Summer Olympics
Sportspeople from Swansea